Rajen Gohain (26 November 1950) born in Nagaon, Assam is an Indian politician who served as Member of parliament, Lok Sabha. He has represented the Nowgong constituency in Assam since 1999 to 2019 and is a member of the Bharatiya Janata Party.

Background
Gohain was educated at the University of Guwahati and graduated with BA and LLB degrees. He married Rita Gohain in 1981 and is father to five children. Gohain is a tea-estate owner by profession.

Political career
Gohain has served four terms as a Member of parliament, Lok Sabha. He has represented the Nowgong constituency since 1999  – having been re-elected in 2004, 2009 and 2014. Gohain has been a member of the Bharatiya Janata Party since 1991.

On 5 July 2016; Gohain was inducted to the Union Cabinet as a Minister of State in the Railway Ministry.

References

Bharatiya Janata Party politicians from Assam
1950 births
Living people
India MPs 2004–2009
People from Nagaon district
India MPs 2009–2014
India MPs 1999–2004
Lok Sabha members from Assam
India MPs 2014–2019